Van Nuys Farm, also known as the Van Nuys Homestead, is a historic home and farm located in Franklin Township, Johnson County, Indiana, United States. The house was built in 1866, and is a two-story, Greek Revival style brick dwelling with a hipped roof.  It features a pedimented entrance with transom and a full-width one-story front verandah added about 1900.  Also on the property are the contributing corn crib and workshop (c. 1840), traverse frame barn, buggy shed (c. 1840), main barn (c. 1840), chicken house (c. 1885), garage (c. 1900), and four double hog houses (c. 1920).

It was listed on the National Register of Historic Places in 1987.

References

Farms on the National Register of Historic Places in Indiana
Greek Revival houses in Indiana
Houses completed in 1866
Buildings and structures in Johnson County, Indiana
National Register of Historic Places in Johnson County, Indiana